The Parliamentary and Financial Secretary to the Admiralty  also known as the Parliamentary and Financial Secretary to the Board of Admiralty  was a position on the Board of Admiralty and a civil officer of the British Royal Navy. It was usually filled by a Member of Parliament. Although he attended Board of Admiralty meetings informally he was not made a full member of that Board until 1929. He served as the deputy to the First Lord of the Admiralty in Parliament and was mainly responsible for all naval finance and spending proposals from 1625 until 1959.

History
The office  was originally created in 1625 with the post holders holding titles under various names such as Secretaries to the Lords Admiral, Admiralty, Committees and Commissions. In July 1660 the post of  Secretary to the Admiralty was formally created which lasted until 18 June 1763 when the office was then restyled First Secretary to the Admiralty this remained in place until 1870 when the First Secretary was renamed Parliamentary Secretary to the Admiralty, while the office of Second Secretary to the Admiralty was renamed Permanent Secretary to the Admiralty. In 1886, the Parliamentary Secretary was renamed Parliamentary and Financial Secretary to the Admiralty. In 1929 the Parliamentary and Financial Secretary is made a full member of the Board of Admiralty. In 1930, the Parliamentary and Financial Secretary served as Civil Lord to the Board of Admiralty. In 1959 the office of Parliamentary and Financial Secretary was abolished with the approval of parliament. In 1964 the Admiralty and thus Board of Admiralty was also abolished and merged into a new larger Ministry of Defence under the control of the Minister of State and Under-Secretary of State for the Navy.

Responsibilities
His duties have included at various times
 All proposals for new and unusual expenditure
 All questions involving reference to the treasury financially
 Accounts cash, store, and dockyard expense.
 Contract business except as dealt with by the controller
 Finance
 Estimates
 Exchequer and audit department—questions with
 Expenditure generally
 General labour questions, including annual petitions
 Payment of hire of ships
 Purchases and sales of naval and victualling stores
 Purchase and sale of ships
 Purchase and sale of stores generally.
 Questions involving reference to the treasury financially, except as  provided for under civil lord

Office holders

Secretaries to the Lords Admiral, Admiralty, Committees and Commissions
Included:
Notes: From 1645 until 1652 there were two joint secretaries.
 Sir Edward Nicholas, 1625–1638
 Sir Thomas Smith, 1638–1645
 William Jessop and Robert Coytmore, (jointly), 1645–1652
 Robert Blackborne, 1652– July 1660

Secretaries to the Admiralty
Included:
 Sir William Coventry, July 1660 – September 1667
 Matthew Wren, September 1667 – July 1672
 Sir John Werden, July 1672 1667 – June 1673
 Samuel Pepys, June 1673 – May 1679
 Thomas Hayter May 1679 – February 1680
 John Brisbane, February 1680 – May 1684
 Samuel Pepys, May 1684 – March 1689
 Phineas Bowles, March 1689 – January 1690
 James Southerne, January 1690 – August 1694
 William Bridgeman, August 1694–26 September 1698 joint with Josiah Burchett until 24 June 1698
 Josiah Burchett, 26 September 1698 – 20 May 1702
 George Clarke, 20 May 1702 – 25 October 1705 joint with Josiah Burchett
 Josiah Burchett, 25 October 1705 – 29 April 1741
 Thomas Corbett, 1741–1751 joint with Josiah Burchett until 14 October 1742
 John Clevland, 30 April 1751 – 18 June 1763

First Secretaries to the Admiralty
Included:
 Philip Stephens, 18 June 1763 – 3 March 1795
 Evan Nepean, 3 March 1795 – 21 January 1804
 William Marsden, 24 January 1804 – 24 June 1807
 Hon. William Wellesley Pole, 24 June 1807 – 12 October 1809
 John Wilson Croker, 12 October 1809 – 2 May 1827
Notes: The Board of Admiralty commission ceased and came under the control of the Lord High Admirals Council from 1827 to 1828.
 Hon. George Elliot, 1828–1834
 George Robert Dawson, 1834–1835
 Charles Wood, 1835–1839
 Richard More O'Ferrall, 1839–1841
 John Parker, 1841
 Hon. Sidney Herbert, 1841–1845
 Hon. Henry Lowry-Corry, 1845–1846
 Henry George Ward, 1846–1849
 John Parker, 1849–1852
 Augustus Stafford, 1852
 Ralph Bernal Osborne, 1853–1858
 Hon. Henry Lowry-Corry, 1858–1859
 Lord Clarence Paget, 1859–1866
 Hon. Thomas Baring, 1866
 Lord Henry Lennox, 1866–1868
 William Edward Baxter, 1868–1871

Parliamentary Secretaries to the Admiralty
 George Shaw-Lefevre, 1871–1874
 Hon. Algernon Egerton, 1874–1880
 George Shaw-Lefevre, 1880
 George Trevelyan, 1880–1882
 Henry Campbell-Bannerman, 1882–1884
 Thomas Brassey, 1884–1885
 Charles Ritchie, 1885–1886

Parliamentary and Financial Secretaries to the Admiralty
 J. T. Hibbert 1886
 Arthur Forwood 1886–1892
 Sir Ughtred Kay-Shuttleworth, Bt, 1892–1895
 William Ellison-Macartney 1895–1900
 H. O. Arnold-Forster 1900–1903
E. G. Pretyman 1903–1905
Edmund Robertson 1905–1908
Thomas Macnamara 1908–1920
Sir James Craig, Bt 1920–1921
Leo Amery 1921–1922
Bolton Eyres-Monsell 1922–1923
Archibald Boyd-Carpenter 1923–1924
Charles Ammon 1924
J. C. C. Davidson 1924–1926
Cuthbert Headlam 1926–1929
Charles Ammon 1929–1931
The Earl Stanhope 1931
Lord Stanley 1931–1935
Sir Victor Warrender, Bt 1935
Lord Stanley 1935–1937
Geoffrey Shakespeare 1937–1940
Sir Victor Warrender, Bt 1940–1945
John Dugdale 1945–1950
James Callaghan 1950–1951
Allan Noble 1951–1955
George Ward 1955–1957
Christopher Soames 1957–1958
Robert Allan 1958–1959
Charles Ian Orr-Ewing 1959

office abolished on 16 October 1959

Departments under the office
 Department of the Accountant-General of the Navy
 Department of the Director of Contracts
 Contracts and Purchase Department

See also
 Permanent Secretary of the Admiralty
 First Lord of the Admiralty
 Board of Admiralty
 British Admiralty

Citations

General and cited sources 
 
 Rodger, N.A.M. (1979). The Admiralty. Lavenham: Terence Dalton Ltd, Suffolk, England, .

P
Civil service positions in the United Kingdom
Admiralty during World War II